Goten Peninsula is the mostly ice-covered peninsula wide  and indenting for  northwestwards between Perrier Bay and Esquivel (Ricke) Bay on the northwest coast of Anvers Island in the Palmer Archipelago, Antarctica.  It ends up in Quinton Point to the northwest.

The peninsula is named after Goten Peak in western Balkan Mountains, Bulgaria.

Location
British mapping in 1980.

Maps
British Antarctic Territory.  Scale 1:200000 topographic map.  DOS 610 Series, Sheet W 64 62.  Directorate of Overseas Surveys, UK, 1980.
 Antarctic Digital Database (ADD). Scale 1:250000 topographic map of Antarctica. Scientific Committee on Antarctic Research (SCAR). Since 1993, regularly upgraded and updated.

References
 Bulgarian Antarctic Gazetteer. Antarctic Place-names Commission. (details in Bulgarian, basic data in English)
 Goten Peninsula. SCAR Composite Antarctic Gazetteer.

External links
 Goten Peninsula. Adjusted Copernix satellite image

Peninsulas of Graham Land
Landforms of the Palmer Archipelago
Bulgaria and the Antarctic